Alov may refer to:
Alov (surname)
Alov, Iran, a village in Ardabil Province, Iran
Alov Kandi, a village in Sarajuy-ye Shomali District, Iran